In enzymology, a spermidine dehydrogenase is an enzyme that catalyzes the chemical reaction

spermidine + acceptor + H2O  propane-1,3-diamine + 4-aminobutanal + reduced acceptor

The 3 substrates of this enzyme are spermidine, acceptor, and H2O, whereas its 3 products are propane-1,3-diamine, 4-aminobutanal, and reduced acceptor.

This enzyme belongs to the family of oxidoreductases, specifically those acting on the CH-NH group of donor with other acceptors.  The systematic name of this enzyme class is spermidine:acceptor oxidoreductase. This enzyme is also called spermidine:(acceptor) oxidoreductase.  This enzyme participates in urea cycle and metabolism of amino groups and beta-alanine metabolism.  It has 2 cofactors: FAD,  and Heme.

References

 
 

EC 1.5.99
Flavoproteins
Heme enzymes
Enzymes of unknown structure